Simpson Lake is a former lake in South Dakota, in the United States.

Simpson Lake had the name of Seymour Simpson, a pioneer who settled there.

See also
List of lakes in South Dakota

References

Former lakes of the United States
Lakes of South Dakota
Bodies of water of Douglas County, South Dakota